Tayyar is a Turkish given name and may refer to:

 Tayyar Yalaz (1901-1943), Turkish sport wrestler
 Jafar-e-Tayyar, one of the neighbourhoods of Malir Town in Karachi, Sindh, Pakistan

Surname:
 Şamil Tayyar
 Nasser al-Tayyar

Al Tayyar Travel Group

Nickname:
Free Patriotic Movement

Turkish masculine given names